Bloodstone is the debut album by soul group Bloodstone. It was released in Europe but not in the United States. The last four tracks, however, appear as bonus tracks on the CD version of their later LP Unreal.

Track listing
"Sadie Mae" - (Eddie Summers)  3:03
"Take These Chains" - (Eddie Summers)  2:56
"You Don't Mean Nothing" - (Charles E. McCormick)  3:37
"Little Green Apples" - (Bobby Russell)  9:02
"This Thing Is Heavy" - (Charles E. McCormick)  3:05
"Friendship" - (Eddie Summers)  3:09
"Lady of the Night" - (Eddie Summers)  3:05
"Dumb Dude" - (Charles Love)  4:31

References

External links
 

1972 debut albums
Bloodstone (band) albums